North Carolina's 50th House district is one of 120 districts in the North Carolina House of Representatives. It has been represented by Democrat Renee Price since 2023.

Geography
Since 2019, the district has included all of Caswell County, as well as part of Orange County. The district overlaps with the 23rd Senate district.

District officeholders since 1985

Election results

2022

2020

2018

2016

2014

2012

2010

2008

2006

2004

2002

2000

References

North Carolina House districts
Caswell County, North Carolina
Orange County, North Carolina